Secretary-General of the External Relations of Brazil (in Portuguese: Secretário-Geral das Relações Exteriores do Brasil, more commonly known as Secretary-General of Itamaraty) is the highest position in Brazil's professional diplomatic career. The position must be occupied by a born Brazilian, admitted to the diplomatic career by public exams, and he or she must be a career ambassador (and not a political appointee). It is generally considered "the most graduated Brazilian diplomat" The Secretary-General manages the Itamaraty, Brazil's Ministry of Foreign Affairs. He or she acts under the guidances of the Minister of the External Relations of Brazil (who can be a political nominee). As vice-chancellor of Brazil, the Secretary-General is the Acting Foreign Minister inside Brazil borders during all the trips abroad performed by the official, political Minister.

The current Secretary-General of the Ministry of External Relations of Brazil is Ambassador Otávio Brandelli.

List of former Secretaries-Generals of Itamaraty 
Otávio Brandell (01-01-2019-present)
Marcos Galvão (25-05-2016 to 02-01-2019)
Sérgio Danese (02-January-2015 to 25-05-2016)
Eduardo dos Santos (26-02-2013 to 02-01-2015)
Ruy Nunes Pinto Nogueira (03-01-2011 to 26-02-2013)
Antonio Patriota (27-10-2009 to 31/12/2010)
 (02-01-2003 to 27-10-2009)
Osmar Vladimir Chohfi (29-11-2001 to 02-01-2003)
Luiz Felipe de Seixas Corrêa (04-01-1999 to 29-11-2001)
Sebastião do Rego Barro Netto (02-01-1995 to 04-01-1999)
 01-09-1993 to 02-01-1995)
Celso Amorim (23-06-1993 to 01-09-1993)
Luiz Felipe Lampreia (08-10-1992 to 23-06-1993)
Luiz Felipe of Seixas Corrêa (23-04-1992 to 08-10-1992)
Marcos Azambuja (15-03-1990 to 23-04-1992)
Paulo Tarso Flecha de Lima (15-03-1985 to 15-03-1990)
Carlos Calero Rodrigues (07-06-1984 to 15-03-1985)
João Clemente Baena Soares (15-03-1979 to 07-06-1984)
Dário Moreira de Castro Alves (14-04-1978 to 15-03-1979)
Ramiro Saraiva Guerreiro (15-03-1974 to 14-04-1978)
Jorge de Carvalho e Silva (09-12-1969 to 15-03-1974)
Mozart Gurgel Valente Júnior 06/02/1969 to 03/12/1969
 29/03/1968 to 31/01/1969
Sérgio Corrêa Afonso da Costa
Manoel Pio Corrêa 1966-1968
Antônio Borges Leal Castelo Branco Filho 23/04/1964 24/01/1966
Aguinaldo Boulitreau Fragoso 30/08/1963 23/04/1964
João Augusto of Araújo Castro 12/07/1963 02/09/1963
Henrique Rodrigues Valle in 17/05/1963 12/07/1963
Carlos Alfredo Bernardes 13/10/1961 30/07/1962
Fernando Bouquets of Alencar 11/08/1959 25/10/1960
Antônio Mendes Viana 05/07/1958 06/08/1959
Décio Honorato of Moura 30/11/1956 05/07/1958
Henrique de Souza Gomes 19/04/1955 30/11/1956
Antônio Camillo da Oliveira 29/09/1954 19/04/1955
Vasco Tristão Leitão da Cunha
Mário de Pimentel Brandão
Hildebrando Pompeu Pinto Accioly
Samuel of Souza Leão Grade
Pedro Leão Veloso
Maurício Nabuco
José Roberto of Macedo Sound
Cirof Freitas Vale
Hildebrando Pompeu de Accioly
Luís Leopoldo Fernandes Pinheiro (28-04-1918 to 22-02-1920)

Sources 

 Secretary General of Foreign Affairs of Brazil
Executive branch of Brazil